Jonathan Coleman may refer to:

Jonathan Coleman (author) (born 1951), American author
Jonathan Coleman (politician) (born 1966), New Zealand politician
Jonathan Coleman (presenter) (1956–2021), English-Australian television personality
Jon Coleman (born 1975), American professional ice hockey player
Jonathan Coleman (physicist), professor of chemical physics

See also
John Coleman (disambiguation)
Coleman (disambiguation)